Hirschi is a surname. Notable people with the surname include:

Frank W. Hirschi (1925–2014), American educator and politician
Hans M. Hirschi (born 1967), Swedish writer and activist
Jonathan Hirschi (born 1986), Swiss racing and rally driver
Marc Hirschi (born 1998), Swiss cyclist
Steve Hirschi (born 1981), Swiss ice hockey player
Travis Hirschi (1935–2017), American sociologist

See also
Hirschi High School, a high school in Wichita Falls, Texas, United States

Surnames of Swiss origin